Disturbance (Italian: Turbamento) is a 1942 Italian drama film directed by Guido Brignone and starring Renzo Ricci, Mariella Lotti and Luisella Beghi.

It was shot at the Cinecittà Studios in Rome. The film's sets were designed by the art director Guido Fiorini.

Cast
 Renzo Ricci as Il marchese Ippolito 
 Mariella Lotti as Silvia 
 Luisella Beghi as Adriana 
 Sergio Tofano as Antonio, padre di Silvia 
 Elvira Betrone as Bice, madre di Silvia 
 Giuseppe Rinaldi as Saverio, il musicista 
 Aroldo Tieri as Aurelio 
 Pino Locchi as Giovanni 
 Tina Lattanzi as La contessa di Greve

References

Bibliography 
 Enrico Lancia & Roberto Poppi. Le attrici: dal 1930 ai giorni nostri. Gremese Editore, 2003.

External links 
 

1942 films
Italian drama films
Italian black-and-white films
1942 drama films
1940s Italian-language films
Films directed by Guido Brignone
Films shot at Cinecittà Studios
1940s Italian films